Balaabad (also Romanized as Balāābād; also known as Balā Bād) is a village in Lay Siyah Rural District, in the Central District of Nain County, Isfahan Province, Iran. At the 2006 census, its population was 36, in 14 families.

References 

Populated places in Nain County